A number of terms are used in Islam to refer to the claims of events happening that are not explicable by natural or scientific laws, subjects where people sometimes invoke the supernatural. In the Quran the term  (plural:  , literally "sign") refers to  signs in the context of miracles of God's creation and of the prophets and messengers (such as Ibrahim/Abraham and Isa/Jesus). In recent decades, the term  has also come to refer to the belief that the Quran contains "scientific miracles", i.e. prophecies of scientific discoveries. "a break in God's customary order of things" was a term used in "theological or philosophical discussions" to refer to miraculous events. "gifts or graces" was usually used for miraculous performances of Sufi saints often used to convert unbelievers to Islam (considered a work of "divine generosity" rather than "divine power" employed in the miracles of prophets).

Definition
A systematic definition of miracles performed by apostles can be found in the work of the Muslim scholar al-Īd̲j̲ī Mawāḳif, historian A.J. Wensinck states. The main purpose of miracle is to prove the sincerity of the apostle and has to satisfy the following conditions:

 It must be performed by God
 "It must be contrary to the usual course of things"
 It should be impossible to contradict it
 "It must happen at the hands of him who claims to be an apostle
 "It must be in conformity with his announcement of it, and the miracle itself must not be a disavowal of his claim"
 "It must follow on his claim"

Theology
Such hadiths and miracles must also be fully believed in for one to be a Muslim.

In , upon which there is consensus, there are two points on this: "We do not prefer any of the saints of this nation over any of the prophets, upon them be peace. We say that a single prophet is better than all the saints put together. We have faith in what has come of their miracles and what has been authenticated in their narrations from trustworthy narrators."

Al-Taftazani lists the following miracles as performed by saints and prophets:
 Contradicting the customary way of things, such as covering a great distance in a short time.
 Appearance of food and drink and clothing at the time of need, as performed by Zacharias
 Walking on water, related to many saints
 Walking in the air, related to Ja'far ibn Abi Talib
 Inanimate solid objects and animals speaking
 Warding off of approaching calamity and protection from enemies

Islam and natural law

In order to defend the possibility of miracles and God's omnipotence against the encroachment of the independent secondary causes, medieval Muslim theologians rejected the idea of cause and effect in essence, but accepted it as something that facilitates humankind's investigation and comprehension of natural processes. They argued that the nature was composed of uniform atoms that were "re-created" at every instant by God. Thus if the soil was to fall, God would have to create and re-create the accident of heaviness for as long as the soil was to fall. For Muslim theologians, the laws of nature were only the customary sequence of apparent causes: customs of God.

Quran

According to Denis Gril, Islam teaches that miracles – i.e. a supernatural interventions in the life of human beings – are present in the Quran "in a threefold sense: in sacred history, in connection with Muhammad himself and in relation to revelation." By contrast, Ali Dashti ( 1982) writes that "there has been much debate[...] on the question whether the Qur'an is miraculous in respect of its eloquence or of its subject-matter, or of both. In general the Muslim scholars consider it to be miraculous in both respects."

In the Qur'an,  the term  is used to refer to miracles—cosmic phenomena for example are —particularly miracles of creation. But it is also used to mean  "evidence," "sign", "Quranic verse", (religious obligations are ). In Islam in general ayah is often used to a mean Quranic verse, but there is overlap in meaning: /verses are believed to be the divine speech in human language presented by Muhammad as his chief miracle, and miracles are a "sign" of God and of Muhammad's prophethood.

Verses of the Qur'an stating that the Qu'ran itself is a miracle – i.e. so amazing it could not have been a natural occurrence – include:
Q11:13 "Will they say, he hath forged the Quran? Answer, bring therefore ten chapters like unto it, forged by yourselves; and call on whomsoever ye may to assist you, except God, if ye speak truth", was revealed in response to polytheists accusation that Muhammad's revelation was invented by Muhammad or came from other men.
Q17:88 "Say: 'If the mankind and the jinns were together to produce the like of this Qur'an, they could not produce the like thereof, even if they helped one another.'" was issued in reply to an accusation found in 8:31: "We have already heard (such things). If we wished, we could say (things) like this. These are only fables of the ancients"

Sacred history
The Qur'an does not mention any miracle for Adam (Adem) who though an Islamic prophet was not supposed to convince anybody of God's message. Sura (verse) 11 (Hūd) and 23 (Al-Mu’minoon) mention miracles of Noah (Nuh), "The oven (tannur) out of which the water burst and announced the flood". Hud, prophet for the ancient tribe of ʿĀd and the first of five Arabian prophets of the Qur'an, does not have any particular miracle (thus according to historian Denis Gril prefiguring Muhammad). (See Q. for his response when he was rebuked for not producing a miracle.)

Code 19 

The term Quran code (also known as Code 19) refers to the claim that the Quranic text contains a hidden mathematically complex code. Advocates think that the code represents a mathematical proof of the divine authorship of the Quran and they also think that it can be used to identify orthographic errors within the Quranic text. Proponents of the Quran code claim that the Quran code is based on statistical procedures.

In the United States, at the end of the 20th century, the Egyptian Quranist Muslim biochemist Rashad Khalifa developed a theological doctrine that influenced Quranists in many other countries. With the help of computers, he carried out a numerical analysis of the Quran, which according to him clearly proved that it is of divine origin. The number 19, which is mentioned in chapter 74 of the Quran as being "one of the greatest miracles" played the fundamental role, which according to Khalifa can be found everywhere in the structure of the Quran, and the fact that a Quranist discovered such a big miracle proved the Quranist approach. Khalifa also cited Quran's chapter 74, verse 30: "Over it is nineteen". The movement popularized the phrase: "The Quran, the whole Quran, and nothing but the Quran." Some objected to these beliefs and, in 1990, Khalifa was assassinated by someone associated with the Sunni group Jamaat ul-Fuqra.

Ijaz movement

Among these miracles found in the Quran are "everything, from relativity, quantum mechanics, Big Bang theory, black holes and pulsars, genetics, embryology, modern geology, thermodynamics, even the laser and hydrogen fuel cells". According to author Ziauddin Sardar, the movement has created a "global craze in Muslim societies".

However, the  movement has been criticized by scholars. Ziauddin Sardar argues that it requires "considerable mental gymnastics and distortions to find scientific facts or theories in these verses." 
According to Zafar Ishaq Ansari, the Quran is the source of guidance in right faith and righteous action, but the idea that it contained "all knowledge, including scientific" knowledge has not been a mainstream view among Muslim scholarship.

Unlettered prophet
For example, according to Fakhr al-Din al-Razi, if Muhammad had mastered writing and reading he possibly would have been suspected of having studied the books of the ancestors. Some scholars such as Watt prefer the second meaning.

However, some scholars argue that the word did not mean "illiterate" but a non-Jewish and non-Christian Arabs pagan Arabs.

Scientific miracles
The theory of the scientific miracle of the Qur'an claims that the Qur'an has a miracle in expressing some scientific material (some modern scientific discoveries that were unknown at the time of writing the Qur'an). The history of writing in connection with the science and religion of Islam dates back to the works of Ibn Sina, Fakhr al-Razi, and Abu Hamid al-Ghazali, but has increased significantly in recent times. Authors in this field include Naeem Al-Mohassi, Maurice Bukay, Rafiei Mohammadi, Mostarhameh, Makarem Shirazi, and Rezaei Isfahani. These interpretations claim that some verses of the Qur'an reflect prophetic statements about the nature and structure of the universe, physics, fetal biological growth, geology, mountain structure, and other phenomena that have been later confirmed by scientific research. This group of Quran commentators presents this as proof of the divinity of the Qur'an.

Muhammad 

The Qur'an does not overtly describe Muhammad performing miracles, according to historian Denis Gril, and the supreme miracle of Muhammad is finally identified with the Qur'an itself. At least one scholar (Sunni scholar Muhammad Asad) states that Muhammad performed no miracles other than to bring the Quran to humanity, and other scholars, such as Cyril Glasse and Marcia Hermansen, downplay the miracles of Muhammad, stating "they play no role in Islamic theology", or "play less of an evidentiary role than in some other religions".

However, Muslim tradition (hadith) credits Muhammad with several supernatural events. For example, many Muslim commentators and some western scholars have interpreted the sura 54 (Al-Qamar) to refer to Muhammad splitting the Moon in view of the Quraysh when they had begun to persecute his followers. This tradition has inspired many Muslim poets.

See also
 Glossary of Islam
 Index of Islam-related articles
 Challenge of the Quran
 Isra and Mi'raj
 Miracles of Jesus
 Miracles of Gautama Buddha
 Imitation and occasionalism

References

Further reading
 Muhammad in History, Thought, and Culture: An Encyclopedia of the Prophet of God (2 vols.), Edited by C. Fitzpatrick and A. Walker, Santa Barbara, ABC-CLIO, 2014.

External links
The Physical Miracles of Prophet Muhammad ﷺ - Yaqeen Institute academic article
The International Commission on Scientific Signs in the Qur'an and the Sunnah
Quran and Science website
The Scientific Miracles of the Holy Quran
The Miracles of The Qu'ran -  Muhammad Mitwalli ash-Sha’rawi
Dr. Zaghloul El-Naggar website
The Inimitable Qur'an
Istanbul Quran Research Association (IQRA)
Quran Miracles Encyclopedia
The Miracles of Al Qur’an and Modern Science